Jeff Hartwig (born September 25, 1967 in St. Louis, Missouri) is an American pole vaulter.

Biography
Jeff Hartwig held the American record until July 27, 2019, when Sam Kendricks set the American pole vault record by jumping . Only Renaud Lavillenie, Sergey Bubka, Steven Hooker, and current world record holder Armand Duplantis have jumped higher in an indoor competition.

With  on 4 July 2004, Hartwig holds the world's best performance for men over 35 years.

Hartwig has received the Jim Thorpe Award as the best American field events athlete in 1998 and 1999.

Jeff vaulted at Francis Howell High School (Weldon Spring, Missouri) and collegiately for Florissant Valley Community College and Arkansas State University. He has trained under the tutelage of USATF Hall of Famer and former world record holder Earl Bell for a number of years. Hartwig has been hired as the pole vault coach for MICDS High School in St. Louis.

Aside from vaulting Hartwig also had another passion, reptiles.  For over 15 years Jeff has been raising reptiles - mostly boas and pythons, but also tortoises, monitors, iguanas, and caimans.  Jeff's first snake was a Burmese python, which he "inherited" from another vaulter.  It was 1992 when Jeff decided to give breeding a shot and was very successful in producing 23 baby pythons.

Hartwig and girlfriend Laura raise the snakes to sell to pet stores. Jeff has been known to have more than 100 snakes on the premises.  None of the snakes that Jeff raises are venomous.  In his freetime, Jeff also enjoys visiting zoos and giving presentations to local schools in his former hometown of Jonesboro, Arkansas.  Jeff's coach Earl Bell has referred to him as a ‘modern-day Tarzan’.

Hartwig holds the current Masters Track and Field American Records in the M35 and M40 Pole Vault.

Achievements

Rankings

Hartwig has steadily climbed the Track and Field News world rankings, peaking at number 1 in 2002.

Video Links
Flotrack Interviews of Jeff Hartwig

References

External links

1967 births
Living people
American male pole vaulters
Athletes (track and field) at the 1996 Summer Olympics
Athletes (track and field) at the 2008 Summer Olympics
Olympic track and field athletes of the United States
Arkansas State University alumni
American masters athletes
World record holders in masters athletics
Track and field athletes from St. Louis
Goodwill Games medalists in athletics
Competitors at the 1998 Goodwill Games